The office of Crown Steward and Bailiff of the Manor of Northstead functions as a procedural device to allow a member of Parliament (MP) to resign from the House of Commons of the United Kingdom. As members of the House of Commons are forbidden from formally resigning, a legal fiction is used to circumvent this prohibition: appointment to an "office of profit under The Crown" disqualifies an individual from sitting as an MP. As such, several such positions are maintained to allow MPs to resign. Currently, the offices of Steward of the Manor of Northstead and Steward of the Chiltern Hundreds are used, and are specifically designated for this purpose under the House of Commons Disqualification Act 1975; several other offices have also been used historically. The appointment is traditionally made by the chancellor of the Exchequer. The position was reworked in 1861 by William Ewart Gladstone, who was worried about the honour conferred by appointment to people such as Edwin James, who had fled to the United States over £10,000 in debt. As such, the letter by the chancellor was rewritten to omit any references to honour.

Appointees to the offices of Steward of the Manor of Northstead and Steward of the Chiltern Hundreds are alternated so that two MPs can resign at once (as happened on 23 January 2017 when Tristram Hunt and Jamie Reed resigned). However, every new appointment revokes the previous one, so there is no difficulty in situations in which more than two resign, such as the 1985 walkout of Ulster Unionist MPs when several separate appointments were made on a single day. If a resigning MP wishes to contest the following by-election, as Douglas Carswell did in 2014, they need to resign the stewardship to avoid further disqualification.

The incumbent steward of the Manor of Northstead is Kate Green, formerly the Labour MP for Stretford and Urmston.

Key

Up to 1899

1900 to 1949

1950 to 1999

2000 to present

See also

Office still in use 
 List of stewards of the Chiltern Hundreds

Offices not in use 
 List of stewards of the Manor of East Hendred
 List of stewards of the Manor of Hempholme
 List of stewards of the Manor of Old Shoreham
 List of stewards of the Manor of Poynings

References 
General

Specific

Northstead